Podkamennaya Tunguska may refer to:
Podkamennaya Tunguska, a river in Krasnoyarsk Krai, Russia
Podkamennaya Tunguska (rural locality), a rural locality (a village) in Krasnoyarsk Krai, Russia
Podkamennaya Tunguska Airport, Krasnoyarsk Krai, Russia